Patrick Luan dos Santos (born 31 October 1998), known as Patrick Luan, is a Brazilian professional footballer who plays as a forward for Swiss club Schaffhausen.

Professional career
Luan made his professional debut with Fluminense in a 1–0 Brazilian Primeira Liga loss to Internacional on 8 February 2017. In February 2019, Luan joined FC Sion in the Swiss Super League. Luan scored in his debut with Sion, a 4–1 loss to FC Basel on 19 February 2019.

On 12 August 2021, he joined Örebro in Sweden on loan until the end of 2021 season.

On 14 July 2022, Luan signed with Schaffhausen in the second-tier Swiss Challenge League.

References

External links
 
 SFL Profile
 ZeroZero Profile
 FC Sion Profile

1998 births
People from Sorocaba
Footballers from São Paulo (state)
Living people
Brazilian footballers
Association football forwards
Fluminense FC players
FC Sion players
SC Kriens players
Örebro SK players
FC Schaffhausen players
Swiss Super League players
Swiss Challenge League players
Allsvenskan players
Swiss Promotion League players
Brazilian expatriate footballers
Expatriate footballers in Switzerland
Brazilian expatriate sportspeople in Switzerland
Expatriate footballers in Sweden
Brazilian expatriate sportspeople in Sweden